Haunted Train may refer to:
Haunted Train, a festival held at Florenceville-Bristol, New Brunswick, every October
"Haunted Train", 1996 episode of Hey Arnold! animated TV series 
The Haunted Wagon Train, a BBC Books adventure book written by Colin Brake, based on the Doctor Who TV series

See also
Death train (disambiguation)
Ghost train (disambiguation)
Phantom train (disambiguation)